A Hydroponicum is a farm, garden, or building devoted to soilless cultivation or hydroponics.

See also 
 Vertical farming
 Hydroponics

References 

Hydroculture